Rasputin, The Prince of Sinners (German: Dornenweg einer Fürstin), or simply Rasputin, is a 1928 German-Soviet drama film co-directed by Nikolai Larin and Boris Nevolin and starring Vladimir Gajdarov, Suzanne Delmas and Ernst Rückert. The film's poster showed the tagline "rysslands onda ande", which translates as "Russia's Evil Spirit". It was shot at the Johannisthal Studios in Berlin. 
The film's sets were designed by Carl Ludwig Kirmse. This film is sometimes confused with another 1928 German silent film made about Rasputin called Rasputin, the Holy Sinner.

This being the only known German-Russian co-production ever done about Rasputin, the filmmakers were able to shoot the film at or near the historical places where the real life incidents portrayed actually occurred. In 1928, the Russian royalty was interested in showing Rasputin as the monster he really was, rather than try to illicit sympathy for the character. He is depicted as a sexually promiscuous alcoholic with abhorrent manners, similar to the manner in which Hammer Films later portrayed him in their 1966 Christopher Lee film, Rasputin the Mad Monk.

Cast
Gregori Chmara as Rasputin
Vladimir Gajdarov as Alexander Kolossov
Suzanne Delmas as Ludmilla Vorontsov
Ernst Rückert as Leonid Vorontsov
Fritz Alberti as Prince Vorontsov, Reichtsrats-Mitglied
Hedwig Wangel as Princess Vorontsov
Mary Kid as Tatiana Oblonskaya
Hans Albers as Sergej Ordinsky, diplomat
Anton Pointner as Peter Avdeev
Günther Hadank as Radlow
Lidiya Tridenskaya as Anissja, the cook
Oreste Baldini as Mitensohn
David Monko as Sokolsky - secretary
Karl Platen as Sawely, the servant

References

External links

Films of the Weimar Republic
German silent feature films
1928 drama films
German drama films
Soviet silent feature films
Soviet drama films
Films set in the 1910s
Films set in Russia
German black-and-white films
Silent drama films
Soviet black-and-white films
Films shot at Johannisthal Studios
1920s German films
1920s German-language films